Pradeep Sindhu is an Indian-American business executive. He is the chairman, chief development officer (CDO) and co-founder of data center technology company Fungible. Previously, he co-founded Juniper Networks, where he was the chief scientist and served as CEO until 1996.

Biography 
Sindhu holds a B.Tech. in electrical engineering (1974) from the Indian Institute of Technology, Kanpur, M.S. in electrical engineering (1976) from the University of Hawaii, and a PhD (1982) in computer science from Carnegie Mellon University where he studied under Bob Sproull.

Work 
Sindhu had worked at the Computer Science Lab of Xerox PARC for 11 years. Sindhu worked on design tools for very-large-scale integration (VLSI) of integrated circuits and high-speed interconnects for shared memory architecture multiprocessors.

Sindhu founded Juniper Networks along with Dennis Ferguson and Bjorn Liencres in February 1996 in California. The company was subsequently reincorporated in Delaware in March 1998 and went public on 25 June 1999.

Sindhu worked on the architecture, design, and development of the Juniper M40 data router.

Sindhu's earlier work subsequently influenced the architecture, design, and development of Sun Microsystems' first high-performance multiprocessor system family, which included systems such as the SS1000 and SC2000.

Sindhu is the founder and CEO of data center technology company Fungible.

References

External links 
 Pradeep Sindhu's entry on the Juniper Networks Website
 Interview with Pradeep Sindhu

1953 births
Living people
American technology chief executives
American manufacturing businesspeople
Carnegie Mellon University alumni
Indian emigrants to the United States
IIT Kanpur alumni
Juniper Networks
Computer networking people
University of Hawaiʻi alumni
American chief technology officers
20th-century American businesspeople
21st-century American businesspeople
American people of Indian descent
American computer businesspeople
American chief executives
American chief executives of Fortune 500 companies
Chief executives in the technology industry